The tricolored brushfinch (Atlapetes tricolor) is a species of bird in the family Passerellidae.  It is found in the Andes of central Peru and Ecuador.  Its natural habitats are subtropical or tropical moist montane forests and heavily degraded former forest.

Taxonomy
The subspecies A. t. crassus is sometimes considered a full species, the Choco brush finch (Atlapetes crassus).

References

tricolored brush finch
Birds of the Peruvian Andes
Endemic birds of Peru
tricolored brush finch
tricolored brush finch
Taxonomy articles created by Polbot